Crotone (or ) is a city and comune in Calabria, Italy. Founded  as the Achaean colony of Kroton ( or) in Magna Graecia, it was known as Cotrone from the Middle Ages until 1928, when its name was changed to the current one. In 1992, it became the capital of the newly established Province of Crotone. , its population was about 65,000.

History
Croton's oikistes (founder) was Myscellus, who came from the city of Rhypes in Achaea in the northern Peloponnese. He established the city in c. 710 BCE and it soon became one of the most flourishing cities of Magna Graecia with a population between 50,000 and 80,000 around 500 BCE. Its inhabitants were famous for their physical strength and for the simple sobriety of their lives.  From 588 BCE onwards, Croton produced many generations of winners in the Olympics and the other Panhellenic Games, the most famous of whom was Milo of Croton. According to Herodotus (3.131), the physicians of Croton were considered the foremost among the Greeks, and among them Democedes, son of Calliphon, was the most prominent in the 6th century BCE. Accordingly, he traveled around Greece and ended up working in the court of Polycrates, tyrant of Samos. After the tyrant was murdered, Democedes was captured by the Persians and brought to King Darius, curing him of a dislocated ankle. Democedes' fame was, according to Herodotus, the basis for the prestige of Croton's physicians.

Then began a period of expansion, although the victory of Locri and Rhegium over Croton in the battle of Sagra in 570 BCE, at first interrupted the advance.
Pythagoras founded his school, the Pythagoreans, at Croton c. 530 BCE.  Among his pupils were the early medical theorist Alcmaeon of Croton and the philosopher, mathematician, and astronomer Philolaus.  The Pythagoreans acquired considerable influence with the supreme council of one thousand by which the city was ruled. Sybaris was the rival of Croton until 510 BCE, when Croton sent an army of one hundred thousand men, commanded by the wrestler Milo, against Sybaris and destroyed it. Shortly afterwards, however, an insurrection took place, led by a prominent citizen, Cylon, by which the Pythagoreans were driven out and a democracy established.

In 480 BCE, Croton sent a ship led by Phayllos in support of the Greeks at the Battle of Salamis, the only one from the Italian coast (Herodotus 8.47). This year marked the beginning of its decline.  It was replaced by Heraclea as headquarters of the Italiote League. Dionysius, the tyrant of Syracuse, aiming at hegemony in Magna Graecia, captured Croton in 379 BCE and held it for twelve years.  Croton was then occupied by the Bruttii, with the exception of the citadel, in which the chief inhabitants had taken refuge; these soon after surrendered and were allowed to withdraw to Locri.

In 295 BCE, Croton fell to another Syracusan tyrant, Agathocles.  When Pyrrhus invaded Italy (280–278, 275 BCE), it was still a considerable city, with twelve miles of walls, but after the Pyrrhic War, half the town was deserted (Livy 24.3). What was left of its population submitted to Rome in 277 BCE. After the Battle of Cannae in the Second Punic War (216 BC), Croton was betrayed to the Brutii by a democratic leader named Aristomachus, who defected to the Roman side. Hannibal made it his winter quarters for three years, and the city was not recaptured until 205 or 204 BCE. In 194 BCE, it became the site of a Roman colony. Little more is heard of it during the Republican and Imperial periods, though the action of one of the more significant surviving fragments of the Satyricon of Petronius is set in Croton, where he mentions the corrupt morals of its inhabitants.

Around 550, the city was unsuccessfully besieged by Totila, king of the Ostrogoths.  At a later date it became a part of the Byzantine Empire. Around 841, the Republic of Venice sent a fleet of 60 galleys (each carrying 200 men) to assist the Byzantines in driving the Arabs from Crotone, but it failed. About 870, it was sacked by the Saracens, who put to death the bishop and many people who had taken refuge in the cathedral but were not able to occupy the city.  Over a hundred years later, Otto II, Holy Roman Emperor, mounted a campaign in southern Italy to reduce the power of the Byzantines. Later on Crotone was conquered by the Normans.  In 1806, it was occupied and sacked by the British, and later on by the French. Thereafter it shared the fate of the Kingdom of Naples—including the period of Spanish rule of which the 16th-century castle of Charles V, overlooking modern Crotone, serves as a reminder—and its successor, the Kingdom of the Two Sicilies, which was conquered by the Kingdom of Sardinia in 1860 and incorporated into the new Kingdom of Italy in 1861.

Crotone's location between the ports of Taranto and Messina, as well as its proximity to a source of hydroelectric power, favored industrial development during the period between the two World Wars.  In the 1930s its population doubled.  However, after the two main employers, Pertusola Sud and Montedison, collapsed by the late 1980s, Crotone was in economic crisis, with many residents losing their jobs and leaving to find work elsewhere.  In 1996, the river Esaro flooded the city, which dealt a further blow to the city's morale.  Since that low point, the city has undergone urban renewal and risen in quality-of-life rankings.

Geography

Climate 
Crotone enjoys a Mediterranean climate (Köppen: Csa).

Main sights
The Cathedral, originally from the 9th to 11th centuries, but largely rebuilt. It has a neo-classical façade, while the interior has a nave with two aisles, with Baroque decorations. Noteworthy are a baptismal font (12th century) and the Madonna di Capo Colonna, the icon of the Black Madonna which, according to the tradition, was brought from East in the first years of the Christian era.
The 16th-century Castle of Charles V. It houses the Town Museum, with findings excavated in the ancient site of Kroton. Notable are also the remnants of the walls, of the same century, and of various watchtowers.
The ancient castle built on an island, with accessibility on foot limited to a narrow strip of land, is referred to as Le Castella.

Government

Transportation

Crotone Airport (Sant'Anna Airport) is served by Italiatour.it and other charter airlines. Crotone also has a railway station, although much of the tourism traffic is served by the Salerno-Reggio Calabria highway and the National Road (called 106 Ionica) leading all the Jonic (eastern) coast from Taranto to Reggio Calabria.
In recent times, Crotone Port has been used by visitors on yacht charter cruising vacations.

Culture

Museums

Crotone hosts a national archaeological museum, a municipal museum, a municipal art gallery, and a provincial museum of contemporary art, as well as the Antiquarium di Torre Nao.
National Archaeological Museum: founded in 1968, it is located on Risorgimento street, in the heart of the historic city center. The building consists of two floors and contains all of the most significant finds from the archaeological sites of the entire territory Crotone. In particular rich archaeological finds come from the Sanctuary of Hera Lacinia site in Capo Colonna.

Sport
F.C. Crotone is a football club in Serie C. The team was promoted to top flight Serie A for the first time in its history for the 2016–17 season, and after one year in Serie B, was again promoted to play in Serie A for the 2020–21 season.

Achei Crotone is an American football club in Italy's 3rd division. It was established in 1989 and is considered one of the most storied teams in Italy.

Сhurches
Church of the Immaculate Conception: the original construction of the Cathedral dates back to the 9th century. Initially it was dedicated to St. Dionysius, and later, around 1462–1463, to the Assumption of Saint Mary into heaven. During the centuries, the church was subject to various restoration, although in the 16th century the bishop A. Lucifero undertook its complete reconstruction, using materials removed from the ancient temple of Hera Lacinia. The interior of the church has three naves divided by pillars.

The Cathedral: in 1686, as attested by an existing marble plaque in the current church, on the old oratory a church was built and dedicated to the Blessed Virgin Mary by a group of lay people who had decided to give birth to a lay congregation in honour of the Blessed Virgin Mary and the Souls in Purgatory,  which was also called  (The Congregation of the Plebeians).
The facade, which recalls in its features the sober and austere neoclassical style setting,  is a harmonious and unifying element. It has a portal with a single architrave, surmounted by a stained glass window, depicting the Virgin, and two niches with statues, all topped by a triangular gable and side pinnacles.

Notable people 
Milo of Croton (6th century BCE – Olympic athlete)
Dameas of Croton (sculptor who created the statue of Milo of Croton, which was placed at Olympia, Greece)
Phayllos of Croton (Olympic athlete/war hero in battle of Salamina)
Astylos of Croton (5th century BCE – Olympic athlete)
Diognetus of Croton (6th century BCE – Olympic athlete)
Eratosthenes of Croton (6th century BCE – Olympic athlete)
Glycon of Croton (6th century BCE – Olympic athlete)
Hippostratus of Croton (6th century BCE – Olympic athlete)
Isomachus of Croton (6th century BCE – Olympic athlete)
Lycinus of Croton (6th century BCE – Olympic athlete)
Tisicrates of Croton (5th century BCE – Olympic athlete)
Democedes of Croton (6th century BCE – physician)
Calliphon of Croton (6th century BCE – physician)
Philippus of Croton (6th century BCE – Olympic athlete/war hero)
Aristomachus of Croton (ancient party leader of Croton during the Hannibalian war)
Alcmaeon of Croton (5th century BCE – philosopher and medical theorist)
Arignote (6th century BCE – Pythagorean philosopher)
Philolaus of Croton (5th century BCE – pythagorean philosopher)
Pythagoras (mathematician and philosopher – lived in Crotone )
Nicholas of Crotone (13th century bishop)
Vincenzo Scaramuzza (pianist and music teacher – born in Crotone)
Rino Gaetano (singer – born in Crotone)
Sergio Cammariere (singer – born in Crotone)
Vincenzo Iaquinta (footballer – born in Crotone)
Autoleon (ancient war hero)
Thomas Arthur Rickard (mining engineer – born in Crotone)
Alessandro Riolo (footballer – born in Crotone)

Literary reference
Crotone appears in the Philippine national epic Florante at Laura as the Kingdom of Krotona. The poem narrates this as the homeland of the protagonist Florante's mother, Princess Floresca.

In Petronius' Satyricon, which survives in fragments, the narrator and his friends arrive at Croton, famous for its legacy hunters. The narrator's companion, the manic poet Eumolpus, poses as a childless, rich old man. Upon arrival to the city, Philomela, a citizen of Croton, seduces Eumolpus by means of her children. The extant portion of the Satyricon ends with Eumolpus explaining that the people of Croton must agree to eat his dead body if they wish to claim his inheritance.

International relations

Twin towns – sister cities
Crotone is twinned with:
 Giannitsa, Macedonia, Greece since 2010
 Porto, Norte, Portugal since 2010

See also
 Capo Colonne Lighthouse

References

 J. Banaszkiewicz, "Ein Ritter flieht oder wie Kaiser Otto II. sich vom Schlachtfeld bei Cotrone rettete," Frühmittelalterliche Studien, 40 (2006), 145–166.

External links

Harry Thurston Peck, Harper's Dictionary of Classical Antiquity 1898: "Croton"

 
Populated places established in the 8th century BC
Achaean colonies of Magna Graecia
Cities and towns in Calabria
Castles in Italy